On February 11, 2016, a gunman identified as 30-year-old teacher Abdullah Jaber Al-Malki, killed seven people and wounded one at an education office in Ad Dair, in Saudi Arabia's Jizan Province bordering Yemen. Five of the victims died at the scene, while two of the injured later died at the Al-Dair General Hospital.

References

2016 in Saudi Arabia
Mass murder in 2016
Jizan Province
February 2016 events in Asia
2016 mass shootings in Asia
Mass shootings in Saudi Arabia 
2016 murders in Saudi Arabia